is a train station located in Shimabara, Nagasaki Prefecture, Japan. It is on the Shimabara Railway Line which is operated by the third-sector Shimabara Railway.

The line follows a scenic route around the Shimabara Peninsula, off the coast of the Ariake Sea. Japan National Route 251 also runs parallel.

Lines 
 Shimabara Railway
 Shimabara Railway Line

It is 41.5 km from Isahaya. Local and express services stop at the station.

Trains to Kazusa were terminated on the 1st of April 2008 after the stretch of line from Shimabara closed.

Station layout 
The station consists of a ground-level platform with a single bi-directional track.

Adjacent stations

See also 
 List of railway stations in Japan

Notes

References 
This article incorporates material from the corresponding article in the Japanese Wikipedia.

External links 
 
  
 Navitime station timetable 
 Yahoo! Transit Japan 

Railway stations in Japan opened in 1984
Railway stations in Nagasaki Prefecture
Stations of Shimabara Railway